The 2014 NZIHL Season was the ninth season of the New Zealand Ice Hockey League, the top level of ice hockey in New Zealand. Five teams participated in the league, and the Canterbury Red Devils won their fourth championship by defeating the Dunedin Thunder in the final.

Standings

Results 
All times are local (New Zealand Standard Time - UTC+12).

Final

References

External links 
 

Seasons in New Zealand ice hockey
New Zealand Ice Hockey League seasons
Ice
New